The BOV M16 Miloš is a Serbian 4x4 multipurpose armoured vehicle (MPAV) used for military and law enforcement applications. It features a V-hull, integrating floating-floor plates, and blast-mitigation seating to protect occupants against land mines and improvised explosive devices (IEDs). The M16 Miloš was first publicly presented at IDEX 2017 exhibition in Abu Dhabi, UAE.

Design
The M16 Miloš is based on a chassis with self-supporting hull and has modern drive assemblies with T700 drive line that has been developed by Timoney and Texelis with independent suspension system which ensures high mobility in any terrain and weather conditions thus enabling maximum combat weight of 14 tons. With use of twenty inch aluminum rims vehicle gains clearance of the 420mm thus allowing high mobility and better off-road capability. M16 Milos can climb forward slopes up to 60%, drive on side slopes of 30%, and successfully cross trenches up to 0,9m wide. Can cross over water 1 meter deep without preparation. Vehicle has turning radius of 9 meters.
The standard version of the combat vehicle accommodates eight member crew, out of which four members are accommodated in the rear part of the vehicle. Fast disembarking and embarking is carried out through the rear hydraulic ramp or the rear door. Members in the front part of the vehicle have access to four standard side doors.

BOV M16 Miloš could be used for the numerous tactical missions and it can be equipped with different types of weapons and other specialized equipment including air-conditioning and CBRN defense systems, modern communication equipment, Command Information System, radar for tracking ground or aerial targets, night vision, thermal and other cameras.

Different types of missions includes patrol, reconnaissance, command vehicle, transportation and support units for special operations (in anti-guerrilla, anti-terrorism and anti-tank operations) such as border and territory control and many other tasks.

Engine and transmission
Cummins ISB 300 hp diesel engine is installed in the front part in conjunction with Allison 3500SP automatic transmission. Such a configuration enables maximum speed of the vehicle to exceed 110 km/h.

Protection and Armor
The main hull is made of special protected sheet steel. Basic armour gives few different level of protection in various parts of vehicles:
 Level III STANAG 4569 (on the front side).
 Level III STANAG 4569 (on the other sides).
 Level IIa and IIb STANAG 4569 (anti-mine protection).

Additional ballistic protection could be achieved by combining the ballistic plates of the additional armor depending on its purpose. Modular amour characteristic provides fast replacement of the damaged plates in field conditions.

Wheels has "run-flat", feature provided by Tyron with the central tire inflation system, ensuring mobility of the vehicle up to 50 km in a case when tires are seriously damaged.

Armament
Current version has armament with one variant of M15 remote controlled weapon station (RCWS) on the roof of vehicle equipped with 12.7 mm machine gun that can be used against ground targets up to a distance of 2,000m and up to 1,500m for aerial targets. Beside RCWS vehicle has 6 automatic smoke grenade launchers on a roof of vehicle in standard configuration. 12.7mm M15 RCWS has laser range finder, day/night sight through appropriate cameras and wide angle camera for battlefield observation. In 2019 a version with minigun on turret was revealed.

Different types of manually or automatic and remote controlled turrets could be placed including the ones equipped with machine guns of different calibers and/or grenade launchers, long-range anti-tank guided missile systems, as well as air defence rocket systems. Optoelectronics thermal imaging and TV and radar systems can be mounted on separate telescopic masts with different heights when deployed. In addition to possible different turrets, the vehicle has 5 loopholes for firing with personal armament during anti-ambush operations, observation holes with ballistic protection.

Variants
 General purpose and patrol vehicle.
 Medivac vehicle.
 Anti-armour vehicle; equipped with Kornet or Nova
 Artillery reconnaissance and battery command vehicle with the integrated artillery electronic direction finder and other systems for surveillance and fire control for different types of artillery units; version in use with the Cypriot National Guard)

Operators

Current operators
  - Cypriot National Guard operates 8 BOV M16 as artillery reconnaissance and battery command vehicles for 24 Nora B-52 self-propelled howitzers.

   
Armed Forces
Army - 20
72nd Brigade for Special Operations - 10 
Police
Gendarmery
Special Anti-Terrorist Unit

References

External links

Armoured Multi-Purpose Combat Vehicle 4x4 - BOV M16 Milosh - Yugoimport SDPR

Wheeled armoured personnel carriers
Armoured personnel carriers of Serbia
Armoured fighting vehicles of Serbia
Military vehicles introduced in the 2010s